Route 155 is a Connecticut state highway running entirely within the city of Middletown. It is primarily used as a connector between the Route 9 expressway and Route 17 towards Durham.

Route description
Route 155 begins at an intersection with Route 17 in southern Middletown. It proceeds east through residential areas for about  towards Route 9, crossing over Sumner Brook and Mill Brook along the way. The entire length of Route 155 is known as Randolph Road. Randolph Road continues east for another  as a local road to Saybrook Road, which was the pre-expressway alignment of Route 9. Route 155 is a minor arterial road and carries traffic volumes of about 10,100 per day.

History
Route 155 was commissioned in 1933 or 1934 as an additional connection between Routes 9 and 17. The eastern terminus has since been shifted from Saybrook Road to the current location, when Route 9 was moved to its expressway alignment in 1967. The Route 155 exit off Route 9 is now signed as the route for Durham.

Junction list

References

External links

155
Transportation in Middlesex County, Connecticut